Andrei Eduardovich Shustov (born 4 May 1998) is a Russian football player.

Club career
He made his debut in the Russian Football National League for FC Mordovia Saransk on 24 July 2019 in a game against FC Torpedo Moscow.

References

External links
 Profile by Russian Football National League
 
 

1998 births
Footballers from Moscow
Living people
Russian footballers
Association football defenders
FC Arsenal Tula players
FC Mordovia Saransk players